Licea pusilla is a species of slime mould in the family Liceidae, first described in 1797 by Heinrich Schrader, and is the type species of the genus, Licea. It was described from a specimen collected in Germany from rotten wood in a pine forest.

References

Taxa described in 1797
Myxogastria
Taxa named by Heinrich Schrader (botanist)